The Comforts of Madness may refer to:

 The Comforts of Madness (novel) a novel by Paul Sayer
 The Comforts of Madness (album) an album by Pale Saints